This is the alphabetic list of the upper class noble houses of Georgia. They were entitled as tavadi, roughly translated in English as "prince" and in Russian as "knyaz", a title which was eventually conferred upon most of these families under the Imperial Russian rule (1801–1917).  


A 
Abamelik
Abashidze

Agiashvili
Akhvlediani
Amatuni
Amilakhvari
Amirejibi
Anchabadze
Andronikashvili
Apakidze
Arghutashvili (Mkhargrdzeli-Argutashvili, Argutinsky-Dolgorukov)
Asatiani
Asikhmovanov (Osikhmovani)
Avalishvili

B 

Babadishvili
Bagrationi-Davitishvili
Bagration-Mukhraneli
Baratashvili
Bebutov (Bebutashvili)
Begtabegishvili
 Bejanidze
Beriashvili

C 

Chavchavadze
Cherkezishvili
Chichua
Chijavadze
Chikovani
Chkheidze
Chkhotua
Cholokashvili
Charkviani

D 

Dadiani
Dadishkeliani

Dgebuadze
Diasamidze
Dziapshpa (Zepishvili)
Dididze
Dvali

E 
Emkhvari
Eristavi of Aragvi
Eristavi of Guria
Eristavi of Ksani
Eristavi of Racha

G 
Gardapkhadze
Gelovani
Gedevanishvili
Gobitashvili
Goshadze
Gruzinsky
Gugunava
Guramishvili
Gurgenidze
Gurieli
Gurji-Revazishvili
Gegechkori
Gabunia

I 

Iaralishvili
Iashvili
Inal-Ipa (Inalishvili)
Iotamishvili

J 

Jaiani
Jambakuriani
Jambakur-Orbeliani
Jandieri
Japaridze
Jaqeli
Javakhishvili
Jorjadze

K 
Kavkasidze
Kashibadze
Karmazanashvili
Kherkheulidze
Khidirbegishvili
Khimshiashvili
Khojaminasishvili
Kobulashvili
Kochakidze
Kipiani

L 

Lionidze
Lortkipanidze

M 

Machabeli
Machavariani
Machutadze
Magalashvili
Makashvili
Maksimenishvili
Mamukashvili
Manvelishvili
Marshania
Melikishvili
Mikeladze
Mirimanidze
Mkhargrdzeli
Mkheidze

N 

Nakashidze
Nizharadze

O 

Orbeliani

P 

Pagava
Palavandishvili
Pavlenishvili
Peradze

Q 

Qaralashvili

R 
Ratishvili
Robitashvili
Rusishvili

S 

Saakadze
Saginashvili
Sologashvili
Shalikashvili
Sharvashidze (Shervashidze)
Sidamon-Eristavi (Sidamonidze, Sidomonishvili)
Sologashvili
Sumbatashvili

T 

Taktakishvili
Tarkhnishvili (Tarkhan-Mouravi)
Tavdgiridze
Tsereteli
Tsitsishvili
Tsulukidze
Tumanishvili
Turkestanishvili
Tusishvili

U 

Urjumelashvili

V 

Vachnadze
Vakhvakhishvili
Vezirishvili

Z

See also 
List of Georgian surnames

References 
Georgian genealogy
Princely Georgian families

Lists of families
Russian noble families
Lists of nobility